Cheshmeh Sib or Cheshmeh-ye Sib may refer to:
 Cheshmeh-ye Sib Deli Gerdu Sofla
 Cheshmeh Sib-e Deli Khomsir